Korzeniówka  is a village in the administrative district of Gmina Dziadkowice, within Siemiatycze County, Podlaskie Voivodeship, in north-eastern Poland.

According to the 1921 census, the village was inhabited by 138 people, among whom 135 were Roman Catholic, 1 Orthodox, and 2 Mosaic. At the same time, 136 inhabitants declared Polish nationality, 2 Jewish. There were 26 residential buildings in the village.

References

Villages in Siemiatycze County